AMRO may refer to:

 ABN AMRO, a Dutch state-owned bank with headquarters in Amsterdam
 ABN AMRO Group, a Dutch bank group, consisting of ABN AMRO Netherlands, ABN AMRO Private Banking, the International Diamond and Jewelry Group, and Fortis Bank Netherlands
 AMRO Bank, a major Dutch bank that was created from the merger of the Amsterdamsche Bank and the Rotterdamsche Bank in 1964
 AMRO, ASEAN+3 Macroeconomic and Research Office
 AMRO/PAHO, Pan American Health Organization